Li Hui (born 12 February 1960) is a Chinese football manager and a former international player. In his playing career he was a striker and spent the majority of his career with Beijing before ending it with German club SpVgg Bayreuth. He also represented his country in the 1984 Asian Cup where China came runners-up.

Career statistics

International statistics

Honours

Player
Beijing
 Chinese National League: 1982, 1984

References

External links
Team China Stats

1960 births
Living people
Chinese football managers
Chinese footballers
China international footballers
1984 AFC Asian Cup players
Footballers at the 1986 Asian Games
Footballers at the 1988 Summer Olympics
Olympic footballers of China
Association football forwards
Asian Games competitors for China
SpVgg Bayreuth players
Beijing Guoan F.C. players
Changchun Yatai F.C. managers